Tonje Hessen Schei is a Norwegian film director, producer and screenwriter. She has directed the documentary film DRONE and Play Again, and has directed and produced the films Independent Intervention and iHuman. She produced Privacy of Wounds in 2018. Her film DRONE won the Norwegian Gullruten award, the Amanda award and the Golden Nymph Award.
 
Hessen Schei studied social anthropology at NTNU before taking a bachelor's degree in film production at the University of Texas, in Austin, USA. She later majored in film production at NTNU (now: Master in Film and Video Production) at the Department of Arts and Media Studies.

Filmography

See also 
 Arne Birkenstock
 Brandon Bryant
 Government by algorithm
 Regulation of algorithms

References 

Norwegian film directors
Norwegian women film directors
Norwegian film producers
Living people
1971 births